Toowoon Bay is a suburb of the Central Coast region of New South Wales, Australia, located on a peninsula between Tuggerah Lake and the Pacific Ocean south of The Entrance.  It is part of the  local government area.

Location  
It encompasses a supermarket/general store, bakery, dry cleaners, burger shop, Newsagent/Post Office, dress shop, Cafe/restaurant, bottle shop, pharmacy, hairdresser, Doctor, Raine & Horne and a few other specialty stores.

The Toowoon Bay beach is located at the eastern end of Toowoon Bay Rd with access from Bay Road (250 metres south of the village intersection).  The beach is patrolled by Central Coast Council Lifeguard's during week days and lifesaver volunteers from the Toowoon Bay SLSC on weekends during summer. The Toowoon Bay SLSC has a  strong local following within The Entrance district.  In 2005, the Toowoon Bay SLSC had a new clubhouse constructed.

The beach is popular for swimming and fishing, with a gentle surf as the beach is protected from winds and strong currents. Sail boarding and kite surfing are popular out on the bay.

The closest shopping centre with full Coles supermarket, banks, and general retail is at The Entrance. It is also at The Entrance where recreation facilities including the ocean baths, cricket pitch, and memorial park are located. Diggers @ The Entrance (Tuggerah Lakes RSL) and The Entrance Bowls are the nearest clubs. The nearest pubs are The Jetty at Long Jetty or at The Entrance.

Education 

Children from Toowoon Bay are in the area for The Entrance Public School.

Transport 
Toowoon Bay is serviced by The Entrance Red Bus Service with one route to The Entrance. The closest railway station is Tuggerah railway station which is serviced by the Central Coast & Newcastle Line.

References

Suburbs of the Central Coast (New South Wales)
Bays of New South Wales